Terreal Bierria (born October 10, 1980) is a former safety in the National Football League. He was a fourth round pick out of the University of Georgia in 2002. He played two seasons for the Seattle Seahawks in 2002 and 2004, starting twelve games in 2004 for a defense that ranked 23rd in the NFL against the pass. He was cut after he left training camp to help families members trapped by Hurricane Katrina. He was arrested and charged with first-degree murder of a man in Slidell, Louisiana but, after two trials, was never convicted.

References

1980 births
Living people
Players of American football from New Orleans
American football safeties
Georgia Bulldogs football players
Seattle Seahawks players
People from Slidell, Louisiana